Zdravko Stoichkov (born 2 July 1964) is a Bulgarian weightlifter who competed in the 1980s. He won several World and European medals. He became a bronze medalist at the World Championship in Moscow at 75 kg in 1983. A year later, he was European champion in Vitoria, Spain, and in Friendship Games in Varna again became gold medalist to score much higher than the Olympic champion of Los Angeles. From this it becomes clear that the boycott of Bulgaria at the Games in 1984 deprived Stoichkov of a well-deserved Olympic title. He became second at the European Championship in Poland in 1985. Stoichkov is the winner of the European Weightlifting Cup for 1987 with the Bulgarian team in Miskolc, Hungary.

He set three world records in the 75 kg weight class. Stoichkov has a very long career. It started in 1977 and lasted until 2003. From 1977 to 1980 he competed for the club Svetkavitsa Targovishte. Then from 1981 to 1995 he was part of Slavia Sofia. Then in the period 1995-2003 Zdravko competed for the German club Durlach. His personal trainers were Peter Yordanov and Lyudmil Kochev. In the national team of Bulgaria he is trained by the legendary Ivan Abadzhiev.

In 2009 he became head coach of the men's national team of Bulgaria. Before that he was the coach of the national teams for juniors and cadets and won many medals from European Championships.

References 

1964 births
Bulgarian male weightlifters
World Weightlifting Championships medalists
Living people
European Weightlifting Championships medalists
20th-century Bulgarian people
21st-century Bulgarian people